Learning Leaders (previously the New York City School Volunteer Program) is a New York City (NYC) nonprofit organization dedicated to engaging families and communities to support student success. Founded in 1956, it works to help NYC's public school students by running family and community engagement programs, which empower parents to foster their children's educational development and training volunteers to provide individualized tutoring and support.

Learning Leaders works closely with the New York City Department of Education in its efforts to create and support partnerships between schools, families and the community to enhance student achievement.

As of school year 2013-2014, the organization has over 4,000 volunteers working with 180,000 students through partnerships with 250 elementary and middle schools across every district in NYC's five boroughs. Seventy percent of all Learning Leaders volunteers, including family and community members, are African American or Latino and half speak a language other than English at home. Some 4,000 parents participated in its family education workshops to increase knowledge and skills on how to support their children's education.

History 
Learning Leaders was founded in 1956 as the New York City School Volunteer Program (SVP), the brainchild of Clara Blitzer, a member of the Board of the Public Education Association. The organization was adopted by the New York City Board of Education in 1962 but became an independent non-profit organization in 1970.

In 1999, SVP changed its name to Learning Leaders and created its website, learningleaders.org to reflect its evolving role in student education and the increased involvement of parents and family members as school volunteers and supporters of their own children's learning at home and at school.

When the City's new ‘Children First’ initiative was launched in 2002, it brought far-reaching structural and curriculum changes to the public school system. Growing parent involvement became a major goal of the New York City Department of Education and Parent Coordinators were recruited for every school. Learning Leaders was, and continues to be, a key partner in this effort.

In 2007, the nonprofit was among over 530 New York City arts and social service institutions to receive part of a $20 million grant from the Carnegie Corporation, which was made possible through a donation by New York City mayor Michael Bloomberg.

Activity 

Empowering Family Members to Support Children's Education

Learning Leaders is committed to effective family engagement, which research has shown to boost student learning and positive child and youth development. It offers a wide range of interactive parent workshops in multiple languages. The workshops cover topics including supporting literacy and math skills at home, understanding child and adolescent development and navigating the middle and high school applications process.  The program aims to help increase parent knowledge about the public school system and learning standards and to develop strategies for effectively supporting their children's education.

Bringing Community and Family Resources to Schools

Learning Leaders divides its volunteer programs into two main models: the Core Program and the Enrichment Programs. The Core Program recruits and trains community and family volunteers to provide students with one-on-one tutoring in reading, writing, ESL, math and other academic subjects at the elementary and middle school levels, as well as non-instructional support such as general office and library assistance.

Through Learning Leaders’ Enrichment Programs, volunteers supplement students’ education beyond core academic support. These programs, which include BookTalk and Book Buddies, promote a lifelong love of reading and literature, encourage students to discuss and think critically and develop confidence and communication skills.

References

External links
 Learning Leaders
 Carnegie Corporation

Educational charities based in the United States
Learning programs